Neil McEvoy (born October 28, 1974) is the co-general manager and director of football operations for the BC Lions of the Canadian Football League (CFL).

Junior career
McEvoy played as a wide receiver for the Surrey Rams of the Canadian Junior Football League.

Administrative career
McEvoy was first hired by the BC Lions as a ticket sales representative in 1995 and moved to media relations in 1997. He then moved to the football operations department in 1999 where he was named the team's Player Personnel Coordinator.

On February 11, 2014, McEvoy was promoted to Director of Football Operations and Player Personnel. In advance of the 2018 BC Lions season, he was retained as the Director of Football Operations while relinquishing the title of Director of Player Personnel to Torey Hunter. Following the resignation of Ed Hervey, McEvoy was named Co-General Manager alongside Rick Campbell, in addition to his title of Director of Football Operations, on December 7, 2020.

Personal life
McEvoy lives in Surrey, British Columbia, with his partner, Keri, and has two sons, Logan and Spencer. McEvoy's father, Clayton McEvoy, played as a fullback for the Winnipeg Blue Bombers from 1970 to 1975.

References

External links
BC Lions bio

1975 births
Living people
BC Lions general managers
Canadian football wide receivers
Canadian Junior Football League players
Sportspeople from Surrey, British Columbia